Clarisse Cruz (born 9 July 1978 in Ovar) is a Portuguese runner who specialises in the 3000 metres steeplechase.

Competitions
At the 2004 Ibero-American Championships in Athletics she won the silver medal in the Women's 3000 metres steeplechase event with a time of 9:55.24.

At the 2008 Summer Olympics she ran in heat 1 of round 1 of the Women's 3000 metres steeplechase event, finishing overall in round 1 in 34th place with a time of 9:49.45.

She competed in the Women's 3000 metres steeplechase event at the 2005 World Championships in Athletics. In round 1 she finished in 10th place in heat 1 with a time of 10:06.96 and did not qualify for the final.

She competed in the Women's 3000 metres steeplechase event at the 2012 European Athletics Championships. In round 1 she qualified for the final with a personal best time of 9:40.30. In the final she finished in 9th place with a time of 9:47.76.

She competed in the Women's 3000 metres steeplechase event at the 2012 Summer Olympics. In round 1 she qualified by performance for the final with a personal best time of 9:30.06. She finished in 11th place in the final with a time of 9:32.44.

References

1978 births
Living people
People from Ovar
Portuguese female steeplechase runners
Portuguese female long-distance runners
Olympic athletes of Portugal
Athletes (track and field) at the 2008 Summer Olympics
Athletes (track and field) at the 2012 Summer Olympics
Sportspeople from Aveiro District